Yarianny Arguelles (born 14 April 1984) is a Cuban athlete who specialises in the long jump. She has qualified for 2016 Summer Olympics.

ELIGIBILITY
CUBA until 31 DEC 2016 – eligible to represent PORTUGAL in National Representative Competitions (see Rule 5.2(a)(ii) of the IAAF Competition Rules) from 01 JAN 2020

Personal bests

Outdoor

References

External links 
 

1984 births
Living people
Cuban female long jumpers
Athletes (track and field) at the 2016 Summer Olympics
Olympic athletes of Cuba
Pan American Games medalists in athletics (track and field)
Pan American Games bronze medalists for Cuba
Athletes (track and field) at the 2003 Pan American Games
Portuguese female long jumpers
Medalists at the 2003 Pan American Games